The United Nations Act 1946 (9 & 10 Geo. 6 c. 45) is an Act of the Parliament of the United Kingdom which enables His Majesty's Government to implement resolutions under Article 41 of the United Nations Charter as Orders in Council. Thus Parliament delegated the power to enact such resolutions without the approval of Parliament. However, the prospective Order must be laid before either Parliament or the Scottish Parliament. A similar mechanism was later used in the European Communities Act 1972 and the Terrorist Asset-Freezing etc. Act 2010.

Provisions

The United Nations Act 1946 contains two sections, though only section 1 has substantive content. Sub-section (1) allows the Crown to implement United Nations Security Council resolutions without the official approval of Parliament. Subsection (2) refers to the jurisdiction His Majesty's dominions, and has been amended over time as the United Kingdom has ceded legal control of its colonies. Subsection (3) says that these orders can be revoked or changed at will. Subsection (4) says that these orders must be laid before Parliament, but that they do not need to be voted on. Subsection (5) authorizes the implementation of these orders to come from general taxation.

As of May 2017, Section 1 read:

Section 1(4)(b) was added by the Scotland Act 1998; before then, there was no Scottish Parliament.

Section 2 states the short title of the Act.

Applications
In 1998, the Scottish Court in the Netherlands was established by the High Court of Justiciary (Proceedings in the Netherlands) (United Nations) Order 1998 which enacted the provisions of a treaty between the Government of the United Kingdom and Government of the Kingdom of the Netherlands. This enabled the High Court of Justiciary to sit in a bench trial of Abdelbaset al-Megrahi and Lamin Khalifah Fhimah for the bombing of Pan Am Flight 103, at Camp Zeist in the Netherlands.

Asset freezing by the Financial Sanctions Unit of the Bank of England was established by Al-Qa'ida and Taliban (United Nations Measures) Order 2002, The Al-Qaida and Taliban (United Nations Measures) Order 2006 and The Terrorism (United Nations Measures) Order 2006 to implement sanctions against terrorist suspects as designated by the UN Security Council Resolution 1267; which covered individuals and bodies associated with Al-Qaida, Osama bin Laden, or the Taliban.

On 27 January 2010 the Supreme Court of the United Kingdom, in the case of HM Treasury v Ahmed held that The Terrorism (United Nations Measures) Order 2006 and Article 3(1)(b) of The Al-Qaida and Taliban (United Nations Measures) Order 2006 were ultra vires and void, because the 1946 Act was not intended to authorise coercive measures which interfere with fundamental rights without Parliamentary scrutiny. On 4 February the Court refused to stay the effect of its judgement until Parliament could change the law. This led to Parliament passing the temporary Terrorist Asset-Freezing (Temporary Provisions) Act 2010 on 10 February 2010 to retrospectively legitimise the 2006 Order until Parliament had time to pass permanent legislation complying with the Court's ruling. Subsequently, Parliament passed the Terrorist Asset-Freezing etc. Act 2010. In 2016, responsibility for implementing the sanctions was transferred to the Office of Financial Sanctions Implementation of HM Treasury. Further powers and regulations were implemented by the Policing and Crime Act 2017.

References

External links

United Kingdom Acts of Parliament 1946
Constitutional laws of the United Kingdom